Karakas may refer to:

Hedvig Karakas (born 1990), Hungarian judoka
Mike Karakas (1911-1992), American professional ice hockey goaltender
Karakaş, Turkish surname
Karakaš, Serbo-Croatian surname
Marica Karakaš
Zdenko Karakaš
Karakaš Mehmed-paša
Ptelea, Evros, formerly known as El-Karakas